Kyankwanzi is a District in Buganda Region of Uganda. It is one of the major political and economic centres of Kyankwanzi District and the district headquarters are located in Butemba Town Council.

Location
Kyankwanzi Town in Kyankwanzi District, Uganda, is located on Bukwiri-Kyankwanzi-Bukomero Road, 25 km off Kampala-Hoima Road. The coordinates of the town are:01 12 00N, 31 48 00E (Latitude:1.2000; Longitude:31.8000).

Overview
Kyankwanzi is situated along the "cattle corridor," heavily inhabited by the cattle-keeping Banyankole and Banyarwanda residents. As such, Kyankwanzi has long been known to the public as the location of the National Leadership Institute (NALI), a government institute, established here because of the history of the Ugandan Bush War by the National Resistance Movement to train national leaders in the public service, military, government security organs and willing members of the populace. When the Act of Parliament ordered inception of a new district in Kiboga North County, formerly part of Kiboga District, the town became the eponym of the district because of people's historical association of the place with the region. The Kyankwanzi District Headquarters' seat is rather in Butemba Town, located closer to Kampala-Hoima Road.

Points of interest
The following points of interest lie within the town limits or near its borders:

 The offices of Kyankwanzi Town Council
 Kyankwanzi Central Market
 National Leadership Institute (NALI) - An institute for training national leaders in public service, the military and state security organs. It started with President Museveni's National Resistance Army, present-day Uganda People's Defence Force, when it embarked on armed rebellions to attack the Obote administration in 1981, commonly known as Ugandan Bush War of 1981- 1986.   
 Beatrice Secondary School Kyankwanzi - A secondary school with sponsors from Switzerland

See also
 Kyankwanzi District
 Central Region, Uganda
 Luwero Triangle

References

External links
Location of Kyankwanzi At Google Maps

Populated places in Central Region, Uganda
Cities in the Great Rift Valley
Kyankwanzi District